Parasinilabeo assimilis is a species of cyprinid fish endemic to China.

References

Fish described in 1977
Parasinilabeo